The Cantino planisphere or Cantino world map is a manuscript Portuguese world map preserved at the Biblioteca Estense in Modena, Italy. It is named after Alberto Cantino, an agent for the Duke of Ferrara, who successfully smuggled it from Portugal to Italy in 1502. It measures 220 x 105 cm.

This planisphere is the earliest surviving map showing Portuguese geographic discoveries in the east and west and is particularly notable for portraying a fragmentary record of the Brazilian coast, which the Portuguese explorer Pedro Álvares Cabral explored in 1500, the Southern coast of Greenland, explored in the late 1490s, and for depicting the African coast of the Atlantic and Indian Oceans with remarkable accuracy and detail.

It was valuable at the beginning of the sixteenth century because it showed detailed and up-to-date strategic information in a time when geographic knowledge of the world was growing at a fast pace. It is important in our days because it contains unique historical information about the maritime exploration and the evolution of nautical cartography in a particularly interesting period. The Cantino planisphere is the earliest extant nautical chart where places (in Africa and parts of Brazil and India) are depicted according to their astronomically observed latitudes.

History

In the beginning of the 16th century, Lisbon was a buzzing metropolis where people from diverse backgrounds came in search of work, glory or fortune. There were also many undercover agents looking for the secrets brought by the Portuguese voyages to remote lands. Among them was Alberto Cantino, who was sent to Portugal by Ercole I d'Este, Duke of Ferrara, with the formal intention of horse trading, while secretly collecting information on Portuguese discoveries. Cantino's diligence is shown in two of his five remaining letters to the Duke, dated from 17th and 18th October 1501, where he describes, amongst other things, hearing Portuguese explorer Gaspar Corte-Real detailing his latest voyage to Newfoundland (Terra Nova) to King Manuel I.

A popular theory, introduced in the earliest studies of the map, suggests that the Cantino Planisphere was ordered to an official Portuguese mapmaker, who made a copy of the royal cartographic pattern, the so-called Padrão Real, kept in the Armazéns da Índia. However, there is no historical evidence that such order was ever made and the theory is weakened by the presence of numerous mistakes. One would expect a carefully made copy of an official standard, if it existed in Portugal at that time, would be accurate. A more plausible explanation is that the map was surreptitiously acquired shortly after it was made for some nobleman or official client. From a letter sent by Cantino to his patron, the Duke of Ferrara, on 19th November 1502, we know that he paid 12 golden ducats for it, which was a considerable amount for the time. An Italian inscription in the back of the map reads: Carta de navigar per le Isole nouam trovate in le parte de India: dono Alberto Cantino al S. Duca Hercole, which translates as 'Navigational chart of the islands recently [discovered]... in part of the Indies: from Alberto Cantino to Duke Hercole'.

While it enlightened the Italians to many new territories yet unknown to them, it was obsolete within months due to subsequent mapping voyages by the Portuguese. Nevertheless, its importance to the Portuguese–Italian trade relations should not be understated; this map provided the Italians with knowledge of Brazil's coastline and that of much of the Atlantic Coast of South America long before other nations even knew South America extended so far to the south. It also supplied great details of the Indian Ocean. A peninsula to the northeast of Cuba has been identified by some others as Florida while others argue that it was actually intended to represent part of China, Cuba itself, or the Yucatan Peninsula.

The geographical information given on the Cantino map was copied into the Italian-made Canerio (or Caveri) map shortly after the Cantino map arrived in Italy and the Canerio, in turn, became the primary source for the design of the newly discovered western lands on the highly influential wall map of the world produced by Martin Waldseemüller in 1507 under the auspices of Rene, Duke of Lorraine.

This old map, made-up by 6 glued parchment sheets, was kept in the Ducal Library, Ferrara, for about 90 years, until Pope Clement VIII transferred it to another palace in Modena, Italy. More than two centuries later, in 1859, the palace was ransacked and the Cantino Map lost. It was found by Giuseppe Boni, Director of the Biblioteca Estense, in that same year, in a butcher's store in Modena. The Cantino world map can currently be found in Modena, Italy, at the Biblioteca Estense.

Construction 

The Cantino planisphere is the earliest extant example of the so-called latitude chart, which was developed following the introduction of astronomical navigation, during the second half of the fifteenth century. Contrary to the portolan charts of the Mediterranean, which were constructed on the basis of magnetic courses and estimated distances between places, in the latitude chart, places were represented according to their latitudes. In the Cantino planisphere, latitudes were incorporated only in the coasts of Africa, Brazil and India, while Europe and the Caribbean Sea continued to be represented according to the portolan-chart model ).

The construction of the rhumb line system in the Cantino planisphere uses two circles (some charts use only one, others use as many as three, depending on size): the western circle is centered on the Cape Vert islands, the eastern circle is centered in India. The circumference of each circle is marked with sixteen equally spaced points, from which radiate the 32 classic rhumbs: 0°, 11 1/4°, 22 1/2°, 33 3/4°, etc. The western and eastern outer circles are tangent to each other at a large wind-rose in central Africa, with a fleur-de-lis indicating North. This dense rhumb-line mesh was used in navigation as a reference, for reading and marking directions (courses) between places. Six scale bars graduated in Iberian leagues, with a variable number of sections (or logs), are distributed over the chart's area. These were used to measure distances between places.

Illustrations are few, but elaborate. Two cities are grandly depicted - Venice and Jerusalem. There is also an elaborate depiction of the Portuguese castle of São Jorge da Mina (Elmina Castle, on the Gold Coast of west Africa), flanked by two African towns. Other illustrations include a lion-shaped mountain representing the Sierra Leone mountain range, the Tower of Babel (laid horizontal), the mythical Mountains of the Moon (legendary source of the Nile River) in central Africa, and either the Table Mountain or Drakensberg range in South Africa. Along the central African coast are the various cross stone markers (padrões) erected by Diogo Cão and Bartolomeu Dias in the 1480s.

In north Africa, there is the "Montes Claros" in the usual place of the Atlas mountains, the legend below on the left reading that "this is the land of King Organo, whose king is very noble and very rich", and to the right that this is the "land of the King of Nubia, the king of which is continuously making war on Prester John and is a moor and a great enemy of Christians".

Discoveries 
The Brazilian coast was certainly the last to be added and reached its present form in three phases: to the first belong an initial coastline running to southeast from Golfo fremosso to Cabo Sam Jorge, and from there, to north of Porto Seguro, continuing further south to the tip of the landmass. An inscription off Porto Seguro records the discovery and naming of Vera Cruz, as Brazil was initially called:

Porto Seguro. Vera Cruz, so called by this name, was found by Pedro Alvares Cabral, a gentleman of the household of the King of Portugal, which he discovered in going as commander of fourteen ships that the King sent to Calicut and, on the way to India, he came across this land here, which he thought to be mainland [terra firma], in which there are many people who are observed, men and women, to walk about as naked as their mothers bore them: they are rather fair-skinned than reddish brown and have very slick hair. This land was discovered in 1500.

Only a relatively small portion of the coast, between the flag near the Vera cruz inscription and the northern side of the baia de todos os santos would have been surveyed, in 1500, by the fleet of Pedro Álvares Cabral. To the second phase belongs the pasting of the strip of parchment between Rio de sã franc° and Golfo fremosso, which would have been based on the information brought by the fleet of João da Nova, who arrived in Lisbon in September 1502. In the third phase the island named quaresma, together with some names written in cursive would have been added.

The European rediscovery of Greenland is thought to have been by João Fernandes Labrador and Pedro de Barcelos between 1495 and 1498, and also visited by Giovanni Caboto (John Cabot), in the English expedition of 1498. But the depiction of the island on the map suggests it was based on the Portuguese mission of Labrador and Barcelos. Newfoundland was probably visited by an English expedition in 1497–98, and again, by the Portuguese explorer Gaspar Corte-Real in 1500 and 1501. The map makes clear that the land was discovered and charted for Portugal by Gaspar Corte-Real, for King Manuel I of Portugal.

North America 

Newfoundland, which was visited in 1500 and 1501 by Gaspar Corte-Real and his brother Miguel, members of the Portuguese royal household, is labeled as Terra del Rey de Portuguall on the Cantino map.

According to certain authors, a stretch of mainland North American coastline is represented on the Cantino map. If the peninsula drawn northwest of Cuba represented the coasts of Florida, it would mean it had been discovered 11 years before Ponce de León got credit for discovering it in 1513. However, other authors dismiss that theory and identify that peninsula with the mainland of Asia, which Columbus believed to have reached, or with the Yucatán Peninsula.

See also
Cartography of Latin America
Early world maps
Windrose network
Map of Juan de la Cosa

Notes

Bibliography and references
 Gaspar, Joaquim A. (2010) From the Portolan Chart of the Mediterranean to the Latitude Chart of the Atlantic: Cartometric Analysis and Modelling. Doctoral thesis. ISEGI, Universidade Nova de Lisboa 
 Gaspar, Joaquim A. (2012) 'Blunders, Errors and Entanglements: Scrutining the Cantino planisphere with a Cartometric Eye', Imago Mundi, Vol. 64, Part 2: 181-200 
 Harisse, Henry (1883) Les Corte-Real e leurs voyages au Nouveau Monde. Paris 
 Harisse, Henry (1892) The Discovery of North America: a Critical, Documentary, and Historic Investigation. London: Henry Stevens and Son; Paris: H. Welter. 
 Leite, Duarte (1923) 'O mais antigo mapa do Brasil', in História da Colonização Portuguesa do Brasil, vol. II, p. 223–81. Porto: Litografia Nacional
 Mota, Avelino Teixeira da (1977) A África no Planisfério Português Anónimo "Cantino" (1502). Centro de Estudos de Cartografia Antiga, Separate CII. Lisboa: Junta de Investigações do Ultramar.
 Pereira, Moacyr (1994) 'O Novo Mundo no Planisfério da Casa de Este, o "Cantino" '. Revista do Instituto Histórico e Geográfico Brasileiro, 155 (384), p. 680–718.
 Roukema, E. (1963) 'Brazil in the Cantino Map', Imago Mundi, Vol. 17, p. 7–26

External links

Carta del Cantino, PDF from the site of Biblioteca Estense, Modena
Carta del Cantino, Cantino planisphere image, zoomable to very high resolution, at Bibliothèque et Archives nationales du Québec. (Click on 1:1 button to get maximum resolution. Click on Image plein écran to get full-screen view.) 

1502 works
Historic maps of the world
Biblioteca Estense
Portuguese exploration in the Age of Discovery
16th-century maps and globes
Este collection